Terrance Lau Chun-him (born 26 September 1988) is an actor from Hong Kong. He is known for playing the leading role in Beyond the Dream, for which he won for the Best Actor award at the 26th Hong Kong Film Critics Society Awards, the Best New Performer award at the 31st Hong Kong Film Directors' Guild Awards and was nominated for Best New Performer at 39th Hong Kong Film Awards and 57th Golden Horse Awards.

Filmography

Film

Television series

Stage
 《舞鬥》 (2015)
 《謀殺現場》A Spot of Murder (2015)
 《電子城市》Electronic City (2015)
 Who's Next II (2015)
 《馬克白》Macbeth (2016)
 《前度》Skylight (2016)
 《在牛池灣轉角遇上彩虹》 An Accidental Rainbow (2017)
 《天邊外》Beyond the horizon (2017)
 《色相》Make Love Visible (2019)
《午睡》Waking Dreams in 1984 (2021)

Awards and nominations

References

External links

 
 
 

1988 births
Living people
21st-century Hong Kong actors
Hong Kong film actors
Hong Kong television actors
Hong Kong stage actors
Taipei National University of the Arts alumni